The men's 1500 metres at the 2022 World Athletics Championships was held at the Hayward Field in Eugene from 16 to 19 July 2022.

Summary

Right from the start, Abel Kipsang went to the front to keep the pace honest. Josh Thompson moved in to follow until Stewart McSweyn took the second position.  They completed the first lap in 55.5.  When defending champion Timothy Cheruiyot moved up to join his Kenyan teammate, Olympic Champion Jakob Ingebrigtsen took that seriously and followed.  The second time down the home stretch, Ingebrigtsen cruised past the Kenyans into the lead.  Cheruiyot marked Ingebrigtsen, with British runners Jake Wightman and Josh Kerr moving toward the front.
By the bell the two Spaniards Mohamed Katir and Mario García Romo had come up to behind the Brits.  Three teams cued up behind Ingebrigtsen.  On the rail, Wightman traded elbows with Kipsang boxing him to the outside.  With 300 to go, Wightman accelerated past Cheruiyot to Ingebrigtsen's shoulder.  With 200 to go, Wightman went for it, passing Ingebrigtsen at the start of the turn.  It opened into little more than a metre gap, but all the way down the homestretch, Ingebrigtsen was unable to close it.  Behind them, Katir came through on the rail, also trading elbows with Cheruiyot before breaking free, drifting to the outside. Wightman beat Ingebrigtsen to the line to complete the upset. Katir trailed them by 3 metres in for bronze.

Records
Before the competition records were as follows:

Qualification standard
The standard to qualify automatically for entry was 3:35.00.

Schedule
The event schedule, in local time (UTC−7), was as follows:

Results 
The first six in each heat (Q) and the next six fastest (q) qualify for the semi-finals.

Heats

Semi-finals 
The first five in each heat (Q) and the next two fastest (q) qualify for the final.

Final 
The final took place on 19 July at 19:30.

References

1500
1500 metres at the World Athletics Championships